Nithya Menon (born 8 April 1988) is an Indian actress and singer who has acted in over 58 feature films and in six different languages:  Malayalam, Telugu,  Tamil, Kannada, Hindi and English .

Nithya Menon appeared first on-screen as a child, when she was ten, in the English film, Hanuman (1998), playing the younger sister to Tabu's character. She started her acting career at the age of 17 by appearing in a supporting role in the Kannada film 7 O' Clock, which was released in 2006. She has played leading roles in Malayalam in Aakasha Gopuram (2008), in Telugu in Ala Modalaindi (2011), in Tamil with Nootrenbadhu (2011), and in Hindi in Mission Mangal (2019).

Early life 
Nithya Menen was born on 8 April 1988 in Bangalore to Malayali parents settled in Karnataka. Menen cannot read or write Malayalam and identifies herself as a Kannadiga. She was educated at Poorna Prajna School and Mount Carmel College, Bangalore.

She has said that she initially wished to become a journalist, but ultimately found journalism unappealing, so she pivoted to filmmaking, and enrolled in a cinematography course at the Film and Television Institute of India at Pune. During the school's entrance exam, she met B. V. Nandini Reddy, who convinced Menen to take up acting.

Career

1998–2002: Debut as child actress 
As a child, Nithya had acted in a French-Indian English film named Hanuman, at the age of 10, playing younger sister to Tabu's character.

2006–2010: Debut in Kannada and Malayalam 
In 2006, Menen started her acting career in a supporting role with the Kannada film 7 O' Clock directed by cinematographer Santosh Rai Pataje. The 2008 off-beat film Aakasha Gopuram, directed by National Film Award-winning director K. P. Kumaran, marked her Malayalam debut in a leading role in which she was paired with Mohanlal. She was in the midst of her 12th class exams when she was offered the role, after Mohanlal had spotted her on the front cover of a tourism magazine, Stark World Kerala. Her performance was well received, with critics writing that she shows "sparkle in her debut venture" and "makes her entry in an impressive role", though the film, based on the Norwegian play The Master Builder, got mixed reviews and was a financial failure. She next made a comeback into Kannada films with the super hit film Josh. She played a supporting role in the film, which received rave reviews, and became a commercial success as well, with her performance garnering her a nomination in the Best Supporting Actress category at the 57th Filmfare Awards South. In 2010, she starred in the Malayalam film, Apoorvaragam where she plays Nancy, a young girl who gets involved with two male students (Nishan and Asif Ali) who are later discovered to be con-artists. The film received mixed to negative reviews, but became a hit at the box office.

2011–2012: Telugu debut and breakthrough 
In 2011, her first release was Nandini Reddy's romantic comedy Ala Modalaindi, which was Menen's maiden Telugu venture as well. The film opened to favourable reviews by critics and turned out to become a sleeper hit, while Menen received critical praise for her performance. Idlebrains Jeevi in his review cited that she "epitomized Nitya character with her fabulous performance", "looks beautiful in all kinds of dresses" and was "the best debut in recent years of Telugu cinema after Samantha in YMC", while another critic wrote that she was a "charming find" and "...quite the Genelia replacement that our cinema so badly needs right now." She eventually won the Nandi Award for Best Actress for her performance and received a nomination for Filmfare Award for Best Actress at the 59th Filmfare Awards South. Further more, she also sang two songs for the soundtrack album of the film, tuned by Kalyani Malik. Nandini Reddy, later, went on to describe Menen as "the discovery of the decade". Following Ala Modalaindi, she starred in Santosh Sivan's historical fiction Urumi as part of an ensemble cast. She portrayed a Chirakkal princess named Bala, playing the love interest of Prabhu Deva's character, which gained positive remarks, with a Sify review claiming that she "looks pretty and is a scene stealer". Menen quoted that much of her character was based on "Santosh's perception of who I am", with Sivan stating that he had written that role for her and that only she could play it. She received a nomination for Filmfare Award for Best Supporting Actress at the 59th Filmfare Awards South She next appeared in ad-filmmaker Jayendra's bilingual venture Nootrenbadhu, which was made and released in Tamil and Telugu(as 180), in which she played a photo journalist named Vidya. She described the character as "bubbly, full of life, nosey, wide-eyed and innocent in life" and to be similar to herself. Later the year, she was seen in Sibi Malayil's Violin in Malayalam and the Gautham Vasudev Menon-produced Veppam in Tamil. She also featured in V. K. Prakash's Kannada anthology film Aidondla Aidu where she played a young bride who is obsessed with making payasam for her new husband much to his chagrin. She had sung and also choreographed one of the songs, titled "Payasa".

Menen's first 2012 release was the Telugu romance film Ishq with Nitin Reddy. She received the CineMAA Award for Best Actress (jury) while receiving best actress nomination at the same event and at the SIIMA Awards. She was later seen in 5 Malayalam films: Karmayogi, V. K. Prakash's Malayalam adaptation of Shakespeare's Hamlet co-starring Indrajith Sukumaran, Poppins, the Malayalam remake of Aidondla Aidu in which she reprised her role from the original and sang the Malayalam version of "Payasa", T. K. Rajeev Kumar's Thalsamayam Oru Penkutty, in which she portrayed a village woman whose daily life is filmed and broadcast as a reality show for a month, Amal Neerad's Bachelor Party in which she played Asif Ali's wife and young mother to their baby and Ustad Hotel directed by Anwar Rasheed where she paired up for the first time with Dulquer Salmaan.

2013–2015: Successes 
In 2013, she starred in three Telugu films, Okkadine, Jabardasth and Gunde Jaari Gallanthayyinde and one Kannada movie Mynaa. She played a character with two shades in Gunde Jaari Gallanthayyinde and she dubbed for herself as well as for the character of her co-star Isha Talwar. For this movie, she received her first Filmfare Award for Best Telugu Actress at the 61st Filmfare Awards South. Her Kannada film Mynaa which won the Filmfare Award for Best Film – Kannada in which she plays a character of a physically challenged girl, became very successful completing 100 days in many centers across Karnataka and her performance was well praised by the critics. She also sang the female version of "Modele Maleyante" which was well received. In 2014, she made a cameo in the Malayalam movie Bangalore Days, which became the highest grosser of that year.

In 2015, Menen starred in numerous films which gave her more critical and commercial recognition. In the beginning of the year, she paired up with Sharwanand for the Telugu movie, Malli Malli Idi Rani Roju, a love story between a Muslim girl and a Hindu boy which is tragically separated by fate. Her performance as Nazeera, the young Muslim student in love who later becomes a successful businesswoman in Malaysia was well praised by the critics eventually receiving her Filmfare Critics Award for Best Actress South, Nandi Special Jury Award and also receiving her second nomination at Filmfare. With this Menen became the first Telugu actress ever to win Critics Award & the Best Actress Award at Filmfare. She did minor roles in the films S/O Satyamurthy directed by Trivikram Srinivas, Kanchana 2 directed by and starring Raghava Lawrence and Rudhramadevi where she shared scenes with Anushka Shetty. She appeared opposite Dulquer Salmaan in two films in 2015, 100 Days of Love, a romantic Malayalam film and OK Kanmani, a Tamil film directed by Mani Ratnam which explored a live-in relationship between a male video game designer and a female architectural student. Dulquer and Menen's on-screen chemistry was praised in the reviews of both films. For OK Kanmani, she received near universal acclaim for her role as Tara and garnered her first Filmfare Award for Best Tamil Actress nomination.

2016–present 

In 2016, Menen starred in three Tamil films. Beginning the year was 24 where she was paired opposite Suriya for the first time. The film was opened to high critical acclaim, with critics praising her screen presence and garnered her a Filmfare Award for Best Supporting Actress – Tamil nomination at 64th Filmfare Awards South. She played the main heroine in K. S. Ravikumar's bilingual project titled Kotigobba 2 opposite Sudeep. Towards the end of the year, she starred alongside Vikram and Nayanthara in a science-fiction thriller Iru Mugan where she had a limited screen presence. In Telugu, she starred in two films, Okka Ammayi Thappa opposite Sundeep Kishan and Janatha Garage opposite Jr. NTR.

In 2017, her only release was a Tamil film Mersal opposite Vijay, where she was praised for her role as a tough yet supportive wife and garnered her a Filmfare Award for Best Supporting Actress – Tamil at 65th Filmfare Awards South.

In 2018, Menen's first release was Nani's Production venture, an anthology psychological thriller Awe, where she became the first mainstream South Indian actress to play an LGBTQ character who is a psychologist. In the film, she and Eesha Rebba portray a lesbian couple who try to get the latter's parents to approve their relationship. The film opened to unanimous critical acclaim with her performance garnering much praise.

She reunited with V. K. Prakash after Karmayogi, Aidondla Aidu and its remake Poppins in the experimental film Praana which also marks her comeback to Malayalam industry after 2015's romantic flick 100 Days of Love. She plays an English writer named Tara Anuradha who battles intolerance in society and is the sole actor in the film.

In 2019, she made her Hindi debut with Mission Mangal alongside Akshay Kumar and Vidya Balan.

In 2020, she starred alongside Udhayanidhi Stalin and Aditi Rao Hydari in Mysskin's Psycho, where she played Kamala Das, a bitter, foul-mouthed quadriplegic ex-police officer who helps nab a psychopathic serial killer. She also made her OTT debut in the Amazon Prime series Breathe: Into the Shadows alongside Abhishek Bachchan and Amit Sadh which received mixed to negative reviews, however she was praised for her role as a desperate mother. She received her first nomination for 'Best Actor, Series (Female): Drama' at the Filmfare OTT Awards.

In 2021, Menen starred in Ninnila Ninnila, written and directed by Ani Sasi, co-starring Ashok Selvan and Ritu Varma where she played Maya, a childlike, adventurous girl who tragically dies in an accident, but whose spirit is still alive in the main protagonist's mind. She made her producer debut in Skylab where she played a rebellious and outspoken daughter of a zamindar in a village near Karimnagar who seeks to discover her identity as a writer.

In 2022, Menen starred in Bheemla Nayak opposite Pawan Kalyan, where she was praised by critics for portraying the powerful role as Nayak wife and the movie grossed over 160 cr at box office. Later she shared screen with Revathi in Modern Love Hyderabad which explores the estranged relationship (due to an interfaith marriage) between a mother and daughter where Menen performance as Noori Hussain was highly praised. Later she appeared in romantic drama film Thiruchitrambalam opposite Dhanush as his childhood best friend Shobana where a review from The News Minute complimented her performance. Nithya got 2-3 offers to act with Dhanush before this film, including for Aadukalam but she couldn't do that because of other reasons. Dhanush also planned to direct a movie in 2018 which would have Nithya collaborating with him, but again that project didn't materialize.  While writing the script for Thiruchtrambalam Dhanush had Nithya in mind for the lead role. The film became a critical and commercial success at the box office and grossed over 100 cr.

Filmography

Films

Television

Web series

Music video

Short film

Voice artist

Discography

Awards and nominations

Notes

References

External links 

 
 

Living people
1988 births
Actresses from Bangalore
Indian child actresses
Indian film actresses
Actresses in Tamil cinema
Actresses in Malayalam cinema
Actresses in Kannada cinema
Actresses in Hindi cinema
Actresses in Telugu cinema
Nandi Award winners
Indian television actresses
Actresses in Hindi television
Indian women playback singers
Kannada playback singers
Malayalam playback singers
Telugu playback singers
Singers from Bangalore
Women musicians from Karnataka
Filmfare Awards winners
Filmfare Awards South winners
Manipal Academy of Higher Education alumni
20th-century Indian actresses
21st-century Indian actresses
21st-century Indian women singers
21st-century Indian singers
Telugu Indian Idol